Croatian Confraternity Bokelj Navy 809  is a non-profit association  which was established in 1924 in Zagreb. It preserves the twelve century-long tradition of the Bokeljs, people originating from Boka Kotorska (the Bay of Kotor). The Bokeljs lived along the bay under various authorities over the centuries, some of which were: the Byzantine Empire, the Kingdom of Duklja (Dioclea), the Serbian Empire, the Kingdom of Croatia-Hungary, the Kingdom of Bosnia, the Republic of Venice, the Habsburg Empire, Yugoslavia, and Montenegro). They were famous seamen, naval heroes and explorers. Their members include Krsto Čorko, Tripun Luković, Petar Želalić and Božo Nikolić.

The Confraternity is based in Zagreb, with several subsidiaries across Croatia, including Zadar, Rijeka, Pula, Split and Dubrovnik). It regularly cooperates with the Bokelj Navy organization in Kotor, Montenegro. It organizes socio-cultural events, the most important of which is The Day of Saint Tryphon. This celebrates the Town of Kotor's patron saint and protector of Kotor Cathedral. Members of the Confraternity often take part in events organized by the association of Croatian historical reenactment units.

The head of the Confraternity is called gastald, meaning superintendent or steward. Next to him there are three procurators and two syndics. The gastald  is Ivo Škanata. Military components of Bokelj Navy 809. are led by the admiral, followed in descending order by the vice admiral, the major, the first captain, the second captain, the first lieutenant, the second lieutenant and the sergeant.

See also 

 History of the Croatian Navy 
 History of Dalmatia
 Illyrian Provinces
 Croats of Montenegro
 History of Croatia
 History of Montenegro
 History of the Byzantine Empire
 History of the Republic of Venice

References

External links 

  Croatian Confraternity Bokelj Navy 809 at symposium on the Croats of Boka Kotorska
 90th anniversary celebration of Bokelj Navy 809
 Saint Tryphon Day celebration by Bokelj Navy 809 in Zagreb
 Bokelj Navy 809 – 12-century tradition preservation
 Bokelj Navy 809 historical reenactment unit
 2018 „Bokelj Night“ in Rijeka
 Bokelj Navy Circle Dance is a tradition preserved by the Croatian Brotherhood of the Bokelj Navy 809

Cultural organizations based in Croatia
Organizations based in Zagreb
1924 establishments in Croatia
Military history of Croatia
History of Montenegro